Rampurhat Government Polytechnic,(Known also- Haji MD Serafat Mondal Government Polytechnic) is a government polytechnic located in RGP College Road, Pubai Dighi Rampurhat, Birbhum district, West Bengal.

About college
This polytechnic is affiliated to the West Bengal State Council of Technical Education,  and recognised by AICTE, New Delhi. This polytechnic offers diploma courses in Electrical Engineering, Civil and Survey engineering

See also

References

External links
Official website WBSCTE
Rampurhat Government Polytechnic

Universities and colleges in Birbhum district
Technical universities and colleges in West Bengal
2015 establishments in West Bengal
Educational institutions established in 2015